FAX was a Canadian daily entertainment news series, which aired on MuchMusic in the 1990s. The series aired both as a half-hour daily show and as short interstitial segments called RapidFAX. Its newer incarnation is MuchNews, which debuted in 2001.

Hosts of the show over the course of its run included Lance Chilton, Monika Deol and Rebecca Rankin, although regular MuchMusic VJs also occasionally served as substitute hosts. The series concentrated primarily on music news, but also covered some film and television news as well.

Entertainment news shows in Canada
Much (TV channel) original programming
1990 Canadian television series debuts
Year of Canadian television series ending missing
2001 Canadian television series endings
Interstitial television shows
1990s Canadian television news shows
2000s Canadian television news shows